Marco Della Vedova (born 27 June 1972) is an Italian racing cyclist. He rode in the 1996 Tour de France.

References

External links
 

1972 births
Living people
Italian male cyclists
Place of birth missing (living people)
Sportspeople from the Province of Verbano-Cusio-Ossola
Cyclists from Piedmont